Below are lists of films produced in Egypt in the 1950s.

List of Egyptian films of 1950
List of Egyptian films of 1951
List of Egyptian films of 1952
List of Egyptian films of 1953
List of Egyptian films of 1954
List of Egyptian films of 1955
List of Egyptian films of 1956
List of Egyptian films of 1957
List of Egyptian films of 1958
List of Egyptian films of 1959

External links
 Egyptian films at the Internet Movie Database

1950s
Egypt